Xanthia is a genus of moths of the family Noctuidae.

Species

 Xanthia approximata (Hampson, 1906)
 Xanthia aurantiago (Draudt, 1950)
 Xanthia austauti Oberthür, 1881
 Xanthia basalis Walker, 1862
 Xanthia cirphidiago (Draudt, 1950)
 Xanthia fasciata (Kononenko, 1978)
 Xanthia gilvago – Dusky-Lemon Sallow Denis & Schiffermüller, 1775
 Xanthia icteritia – The Sallow Hufnagel, 1766
 Xanthia ladakhensis Hacker & Ronkay, 1992
 Xanthia ledereri Staudinger, 1896
 Xanthia minor Felder & Rogenhofer, 1874
 Xanthia moderata Walker, 1869
 Xanthia ocellaris – Pale-Lemon Sallow Borkhausen, 1792
 Xanthia rectilineata Hampson, 1894
 Xanthia tatago Lafontaine & K. Mikkola, 2003
 Xanthia togata – Pink-barred Sallow Esper, 1788
 Xanthia tunicata Graeser, 1890
 Xanthia veterina Eversmann, 1855
 Xanthia xanthophylla Hreblay & Ronkay, 1998

References
 Lafontaine, J.D. & Mikkola, K. (2003). "New species of Xanthia (Lepidoptera: Noctuidae) from North America." The Canadian Entomologist 135: 549-554. 
 Natural History Museum Lepidoptera genus database
 Xanthia at funet

External links

Cuculliinae
Taxa named by Ferdinand Ochsenheimer